Hemicaranx is a genus of ray-finned fish from the family Carangidae, the jacks, pompanos, scads and trevallies, found in the Atlantic and Pacific oceans.

Species
There are currently four recognized species in this genus:

References

 
Caranginae
Marine fish genera
Taxa named by Pieter Bleeker